Veeraganur is a town municipality in Salem district in the Indian state of Tamil Nadu.

References

Cities and towns in Salem district